Yun Sŏn-Do is a crater on Mercury. Its name was adopted by the International Astronomical Union (IAU) in 1976. Yun Sŏn-Do is named for the Korean poet Yun Seondo.

References

Impact craters on Mercury